Rugby Junction is an unincorporated community in the town of Polk, Washington County, Wisconsin, United States.

History
The night of October 16, 1901, two Chicago-bound freight trains collided on the Wisconsin Central Railway tracks between Colgate and Rugby Junction.  Two cars derailed, but no injuries were reported. The Wisconsin Central Railway amalgamated with the Minneapolis, St. Paul and Sault Ste. Marie in 1961 to form the Soo Line Railroad. In a drastic effort to cut costs, the Soo Line created the Lake States Transportation Division, but that did not come out too good. The Soo Line sold its obtained Chicago-Minneapolis mainline (Waukesha Subdivision) to the Wisconsin Central Ltd. in 1987. The WC operated for fourteen years before being usurped by the Canadian National Railway in 2001.

Notes

Unincorporated communities in Washington County, Wisconsin
Unincorporated communities in Wisconsin